Bierzewice  is a village in the administrative district of Gmina Gostynin, within Gostynin County, Masovian Voivodeship, in east-central Poland.

References

Bierzewice